The US Post Office-Weymouth Landing is a historic post office building at 103 Washington Street in Weymouth, Massachusetts.  The single story stone building was built in 1941, and is locally distinctive as a rare construction in granite.  The basic design of the building is similar to other post office designs of the 1930s and 1940s.  It has a five-bay facade, three of which project, providing the entrance.  The building is topped by a side-gable roof with a wooden cornice, with a louvered belfry topping the roof.

The building was listed on the National Register of Historic Places in 1986.

See also 

National Register of Historic Places listings in Norfolk County, Massachusetts
List of United States post offices

References 

Weymouth
Buildings and structures in Norfolk County, Massachusetts
Weymouth, Massachusetts
National Register of Historic Places in Norfolk County, Massachusetts